Ohana is a Hebrew-language surname. There are two suggested origins of this and similar Jewish-Berber surnames. One of them suggests that it means "son of Hanna". Another suggests it is from a occupation related to growing or trading henna.

 Amir Ohana (born 1976), Israeli politician
 Asher Ohana (born 1945), Israeli civil servant 
 Cláudia Ohana (born 1963), Brazilian actress
 Eli Ohana (born 1964), Israeli footballer and football coach
 Esther Ohana (died 1983), the first Israeli killed by Palestinian stone-throwing
 Maurice Ohana (1913-1992), Anglo-French composer
 Michael Ohana (born 1995), Israeli footballer
 Shirley Ohana (born 1983), Israeli footballer
 Tal Ohana (fl. 2010s), mayor of Yeruham, Israel

References

External links

Hebrew-language surnames